Pozières is a commune in the Somme department in Hauts-de-France in northern France.

Geography

Southwest of the village on Departmental Road 929 is the Pozières Memorial and Pozieres British Cemetery. The cemetery. A total of 14,720 men, mostly Australians, are buried here. Unidentified dead number 1,380. The memorial was dedicated in August 1930.

Population

History

The village was completely destroyed in World War I during what became the Battle of Pozières (23 July–7 August 1916), which was part of the Battle of the Somme. The village was subsequently rebuilt, and is now the site of several war memorials. The Australian flag flies over Pozières in recognition of the sacrifice of the ANZACs in the Battle of Pozières. Amongst the British and other Commonwealth forces who fought at Pozières, the Australians suffered over 5,000 killed, wounded or taken prisoner.

One of those killed, on 5 August, was the English composer George Butterworth, and in 2008 the road between the town and Martinpuich was renamed  (George Butterworth Lane)).

Gallery

See also
Communes of the Somme department
Pozières Memorial

Notes

References

External links

 Pozieres in WWI

Communes of Somme (department)
World War I sites in France